Costaclis is a genus of medium-sized sea snails, marine gastropod mollusks in the family Eulimidae.

Species
The species within this genus include the following:
 Costaclis egregia (Dall, 1889)
 Costaclis hyalina (Watson, 1881)
 Costaclis mizon (Watson, 1881)

Species brought into synonymy
 Costaclis joubini (Dautzenberg & Fischer, 1897): synonym of  Costaclis mizon (Watson, 1881)
 Costaclis muchia (Locard, 1896): synonym of Costaclis mizon (Watson, 1881)
 Costaclis nucleata (Dall, 1889): synonym of Costaclis hyalina (Watson, 1881)

References

External links
 To World Register of Marine Species

Eulimidae